The 1991 World Cup took place 31 October – 3 November 1991 at the Le Querce Golf Club, name later changed to Golf Nazionale, 30 miles north of Rome, Italy. It was the 37th World Cup event. The tournament was a 72-hole stroke play team event with 32 teams. Each team consisted of two players from a country. The combined score of each team determined the team results. The Swedish team of Anders Forsbrand and Per-Ulrik Johansson won by one stroke over the Wales team of Ian Woosnam and Phillip Price. The individual competition was won by Woosnam. This was the second team victory in professional golf within a month for Sweden, winning also the 1991 Dunhill Cup for three-men teams, were the Swedish team also included Forsbrand and Johansson. By the win, Sweden became the first nation to simultaneously hold the team titles in the Eisenhower Trophy, the Dunhill Cup and the World Cup in men's golf.

Teams

Scores
Team

International Trophy

References

World Cup (men's golf)
Golf tournaments in Italy
Sports competitions in Rome
World Cup golf
World Cup golf
World Cup golf
World Cup golf
1990s in Rome